The 1966–67 Rheinlandliga was the 15th season of the highest amateur class of the Rhineland Football Association under the name of 1. Amateurliga Rheinland. It was a predecessor of today's Rheinlandliga.

Results
Rhineland champion was SSV Mülheim. FV Engers 07 took part as a Rhineland representative at the German football amateur championship 1967, failed there, in the round of the last 16, against  Niederrhein representative Bayer Uerdingen.

For the relegation to the second amateur league, last seasons teams that moved up, SV Ehrang and FC Horchheim, as well as FV Rübenach had to move down.

For the following 1967/68 season, SG Altenkirchen, FC Bitburg and SV Niederlahnstein moved up from the 2. Amateur league, as well as Germania Metternich, who moved down from the II.Division.

References

1966 in association football
Football in Rhineland-Palatinate
1967 in association football